The 1966 Dissolution Honours List was issued on 19 May 1966 following the dissolution of the United Kingdom parliament in preparation for a general election.

The recipients of honours are displayed here as they were styled before their new honour.

Life Peers

Barons
 Rt Hon. Henry Brooke , Member of Parliament for West Lewisham, 1938-1945; and for Hampstead, 1950-1966. Financial Secretary, H.M. Treasury, 1954-1957; Minister of Housing and Local Government and Minister for Welsh Affairs, 1957-1961; Chief Secretary, H.M. Treasury, and Paymaster-General 1961-1962; Home Secretary 1962-1964.
 Rt Hon. Sir William Anstruther-Gray , Member of Parliament for North Lanark, 1931-1945 and for Berwick and East Lothian, 1951-1966. Deputy Chairman of Ways and Means, 1959-1962 and Chairman of Ways and Means and Deputy Speaker, House of Commons, 1962-1964.
 Rt Hon. Arthur Henderson , Member of Parliament for South Cardiff, 1923-1924 and 1929-1931; and for Kingswinford Division of Staffordshire, 1935-1950; Rowley Regis and Tipton 1950-1966. Financial Secretary, War Office, 1943-1945; Parliamentary Under Secretary of State, India Office and Burma Office, 1945-1947; Minister of State for Commonwealth Relations, 1947; Secretary of State for Air, 1947-1951. Vice-President, Council of Europe Assembly, 1961-1962.
 Rt Hon. Thomas William Jones , Member of Parliament for Merioneth, 1951-1966. Welfare Officer and Education Officer for Merseyside and North Wales Electricity Board in North Wales.
 Rt Hon. Walter Monslow, Member of Parliament for Barrow-in-Furness, 1945-1966. Formerly Organising Secretary, Associated Society of Locomotive Engineers and Firemen.
 Rt Hon. Sir George Richard Hodges Nugent , Member of Parliament for Guildford Division of Surrey, 1950-1966. Parliamentary Secretary, Ministry of Agriculture and Fisheries, 1951-1955: to Ministry of Agriculture, Fisheries and Food, 1955-1957: and to Ministry of Transport and Civil Aviation, 1957-1959; Chairman, House of Commons Select Committee on Nationalised Industries, 1961-1964; Chairman, Standing Conference on London Regional Planning since 1962.
 Rt Hon. George Pargiter , Member of Parliament for Spelthorne Division of Middlesex, 1945-1950 and for Southall, 1950-1966. Member, Middlesex County Council, 1934-1965: Chairman, 1959-1960. Chairman, Executive of the County Councils Association, 1963.
 Rt Hon. Ernest Popplewell , Member of Parliament for Newcastle upon Tyne, West, 1945-1966. Vice-Chamberlain of H.M. Household, 1947-1951; an Opposition Whip, 1951-1955; Opposition Deputy Chief Whip, 1955-1959; Chairman, Select Committee on Nationalised Industries 1964-1966.
 Rt Hon. Sir Martin Redmayne , Member of Parliament for Rushcliffe Division of Nottinghamshire, 1950-1966. Government Whip, 1951; A Lord Commissioner, H.M. Treasury, 1953-1959; Deputy Government Chief Whip, 1955-1959; Parliamentary Secretary, H.M. Treasury and Government Chief Whip, 1959-1964.
 Rt Hon. Sir Frank Soskice , Member of Parliament for Birkenhead East, 1945-1950: for Neepsend Division of Sheffield, 1950-1955 and for Newport, Monmouthshire, 1956-1966. Solicitor-General, 1945-1951; Attorney-General, 1951; Home Secretary, 1964-1965; Lord Privy Seal, 1965-1966.
 Rt Hon. Sir Samuel Storey , Member of Parliament for Sunderland, 1931-1945 and for Stretford, 1950-1966. Deputy Chairman of Ways and Means, 1964-1965; Chairman of Ways and Means and Deputy Speaker, House of Commons, 1965-1966.
 Rt Hon. Harry Bernard Taylor , Member of Parliament for Mansfield Division of Nottinghamshire, 1941-1966. Parliamentary Secretary, Ministry of National Insurance, 1950-1951.

Privy Council
 Rt Hon. Edward Shackleton, Baron Shackleton , Member of Parliament for Preston, 1946-1950 and for Preston South, 1950-1955. Minister of Defence (Royal Air Force) since 1964.

Companions of Honour
 Lady Megan Lloyd George , Member of Parliament for Anglesey, 1929-1951 and for Carmarthen, 1957-1966. For political and public services (posthumously).
 Rt Hon. Jim Griffiths , Member of Parliament for Llanelly Division of Carmarthenshire since 1936. Minister of National Insurance, 1945-1950; Secretary of State for the Colonies, 1950-1951; Secretary of State for Wales, 1964-1966. For political and public services.

References

Dissolution Honours
Dissolution Honours 1966